The Park Square Theatre was a theatre in Park Square in Boston, Massachusetts, designed by architect Clarence Blackall. It opened January 19, 1914, as the Cort Theatre, named for impresario John Cort. It was his first theatrical venue in Boston.

In August 1915 the Cort Theatre was purchased by Archibald and Edgar Selwyn and renamed the Park Square Theatre. In 1921 it was renamed the Selwyn Theatre, one of many Selwyn theatres in the United States. In time the building was replaced by a parking garage.

Shows

The Cort Theatre opened Monday, January 19, 1914, with the musical comedy, When Dreams Come True. Joseph Santley starred, reprising his role in the Broadway production. Other shows include the following:

 Twin Beds
 James Forbes' The Show Shop, with George Sidney and Zelda Sears
 Roi Cooper Megrue's Under Fire, with William Courtenay
 Edgar Selwyn's Rolling Stones
 Jane Cowl and Jane Murfin's Lilac Time
 Avery Hopwood's Fair and Warmer
 The Naughty Wife, with Charles Cherry
 George V. Hobart's Buddies
 Edgar Selwyn and Channing Pollock's The Crowded Hour, with Wilette Kershaw
 Eugene Walter's The Challenge, with Holbrook Blinn
 Nightie Night, with Francis Byrne
 Roi Cooper Megrue's T for 3, with Arthur Byron
 The Right Girl, with Charles Purcell

Gallery

References

External links

 Library of Congress. Drawing of Selwyn's Park Sq. Theatre, formerly Cort Theatre, Providence St. and Park Sq., Boston, Massachusetts. 1922.
 Bostonian Society:
 Photo of Selwyn Theatre, Park Square, Boston, ca.1925
 Photo of Selwyn Theatre, Columbus Avenue and Park Square, Boston, ca.1925
 Photo of Selwyn Theatre, Park Square, Boston, ca.1925

Former theatres in Boston
1914 establishments in Massachusetts
Cultural history of Boston
20th century in Boston
Back Bay, Boston
Event venues established in 1914